José Manuel Moreno Fernández (3 August 1916 — 26 August 1978), nicknamed "El Charro", was an Argentine footballer  who played as an inside forward for several clubs in Argentina, Mexico, Chile, and Colombia; for many who saw him play, he is regarded as one of the greatest players of all time, even among Diego Maradona, Pelé and Alfredo Di Stéfano, and was the first footballer ever to have won first division league titles in four countries (later players to emulate the feat include Jiri Jarosik, Rivaldo, George Weah and Zlatan Ibrahimović).

Moreno was part of the River Plate team known as La Máquina ("The Machine") which dominated Argentine football in the 1940s, and was also a member of the Argentina national team that won the South American Championships in 1941 and 1947, being chosen in the latter tournament as the best player of the tournament.

He was regarded by many as a complete player. In 1999, he was ranked as the 5th best South American player in the 20th century (behind Pelé, Maradona, Di Stéfano and Garrincha), and among the 25 best players in the world through a poll by the IFFHS. He was known as a player of great technique, great vision, and lethal in the penalty area. Despite his reputation for drinking, smoking and not going to training, Moreno was also known for his formidable heading ability, scoring 75 with his head, he also had fine physical qualities.

Club career
Moreno was born in the neighbourhood of La Boca, in Buenos Aires, and grew up in the surroundings of the club Boca Juniors' stadium, La Bombonera. At the age of 15, he tried out for the lower divisions of Boca Juniors, but did not make the selection. According to the Argentine Football Association archives, he said, frustrated: "some time you will regret it". Moreno then became part of the lower divisions of River Plate, Boca Junior's arch-rival, in 1933, having been recommended by Bernabé Ferreyra, a notable forward for River Plate.

River Plate (1935–1944)

At the age of 18, Moreno was selected along with other young players from the club by manager Emérico Hirschl to make a tour in Brazil. His first competitive appearance was against Brazilian side Botafogo. He debuted in Primera División on March 17, 1935, in a 2–1 win against C.A. Platense, scoring one goal. Quickly become the greatest figure of Argentine soccer, he was part of the squad that won league titles in 1936 and 1937, and went on to become a key player among Adolfo Pedernera on the River Plate squad known as La Máquina, famous for his line of attack composed by Moreno, Pedernera, Ángel Labruna, Juan Carlos Muñoz, and Félix Loustau, and which dominated Argentine football during the first half of the 1940s decade, winning with Moreno two national titles (1941, 1942) and many Aldao Cups.

Mexico (1944–1946)
In 1944, Moreno was transferred to México Primera División club España, who had finished runner up to Asturias, first Mexican league champions in the 1943–44 season. With España, Moreno won the national title in the 1945–46 season. His time and success in Mexico earned him the nickname Charro, which is also the term used to refer to the traditional cowboy of Mexico.

Return to South America (1946–1961)
Moreno returned to his homeland and River Plate for the latter part of 1946. His second tenure at River lasted three seasons. Champion again in 1947, already with Alfredo Di Stéfano as center forward, he returned to emigrate after the strike of 1948 players. He was transferred to Universidad Católica of Chile, where in the same year he helped the team win its first league title. He returned to Argentina in 1950, this time to play for Boca Juniors, and the following year, he played again for Universidad Católica. He also played one season in Uruguay, with Primera División team Defensor. In 1953, he went back to Argentina to join Ferrocarril Oeste.

Colombia
Moreno moved to Colombia in 1954, joining Independiente Medellín, where he would end his playing career. He was both a player and a manager for the club. He won the Colombian championship in 1955, becoming the only footballer to have won league titles in four countries' leagues, doing so in Argentina, Mexico, Chile, and Colombia. In 1957, he won his last – and 12th overall – first division title. He retired with Independiente Medellín in a friendly match against Boca Juniors in 1961, a match during which he participated both as coach and player. Independiente won the match 5–2, and Moreno scored one goal.

International career

Moreno was a member of the Argentina national team from 1936 to 1950, earning 34 caps and scoring 19 goals. Moreno was part of the winning squads at the South American Championships (now Copa América) of 1941, 1942 and 1947. He scored the tournament's milestone goal number 500 in an atypical match against Ecuador: he scored five goals in that match, a Copa América record which he shares with Héctor Scarone (Uruguay), Juan Marvezzi (Argentina) and Evaristo (Brazil). That day, Argentina beat Ecuador 12–0, which is also the largest goal difference in a single Copa América match.

Moreno was the top goalscorer of the 1942 South American Championship with seven goals, along with Herminio Masantonio, and was chosen best player of the 1947 edition. He is also tied for third place among the Copa América's all-time top scorers, with 13 overall goals.

Managerial career
Moreno had a brief spell as manager of Argentina in 1959. He also worked as the manager of Boca Juniors, Huracán and All Boys in Argentina and Colo-Colo in Chile.

Honours

Club
River Plate
 Primera División (6): 1936 Copa Campeonato, 1936 Copa de Oro, 1937, 1941, 1942, 1947
 Copa Aldao (4): 1936, 1937, 1941, 1947
 Copa Ibarguren (3): 1937, 1941, 1942
 Copa Adrián C. Escobar (1): 1941
RC España
 Primera División (1): 1944-45
Universidad Católica
 Campeonato Nacional (1): 1949
Independiente Medellín
 Primera División (2): 1955, 1957

International
Argentina
 South American Championship (2): 1941, 1947

Individual
 1942 South American Championship Top Scorer among Herminio Masantonio
 1947 South American Championship Best Player
 Best Player of Chile in 1949.
 "Premio Konex de Platino" 1980
 He was selected among the 25 best players in the world in the 20th century by the IFFHS in 1999. He also ranked as the fifth best player in South America, and as the third best in Argentina, behind Diego Maradona and Alfredo Di Stéfano.

References

Further reading

External links

 
 Player profile and statistics (with translation) 

1916 births
1978 deaths
Footballers from Buenos Aires
Argentine footballers
Argentina international footballers
Club Atlético River Plate footballers
Boca Juniors footballers
Ferro Carril Oeste footballers
Club Deportivo Universidad Católica footballers
Defensor Sporting players
Independiente Medellín footballers
Argentine Primera División players
Liga MX players
Categoría Primera A players
Chilean Primera División players
Uruguayan Primera División players
Expatriate footballers in Mexico
Expatriate footballers in Chile
Expatriate footballers in Uruguay
Expatriate footballers in Colombia
Argentine expatriate footballers
Argentine expatriate sportspeople in Mexico
Argentine expatriate sportspeople in Chile
Argentine expatriate sportspeople in Uruguay
Argentine expatriate sportspeople in Colombia
Expatriate football managers in Chile
Argentine football managers
Argentina national football team managers
Boca Juniors managers
Club Atlético Huracán managers
Colo-Colo managers
Club Deportivo Universidad Católica managers
All Boys managers
Independiente Medellín managers
Real Club España footballers
Copa América-winning players
Association football forwards